Badminton events for the 1965 Southeast Asian Peninsular Games were held at Kuala Lumpur, Malaysia between 14 to 21 December 1965. Individual as well as Team competitions were conducted. At the end of the competitions, Malaysia emerged as top by winning five out of seven gold medals while Thailand settled with two gold medals.

Medalists

Final results

Medal table

References

External links 

1965
1965 in badminton
1965 in Malaysian sport
Sports competitions in Kuala Lumpur
Events at the 1965 Southeast Asian Peninsular Games